Brisom is a synthwave pop band from Manila, Philippines. Formed in 2013, it is composed of Brian Sombero on vocals, guitars and synths, Timothy Abbott on synths, beats and programming, Jason Rondero on bass, and Jeffrey Castro on drums and samplers.

The band has been known for their 80s-inspired synth music. They released their debut EP Perspectives in 2014, followed by the release of their full-length album Limerence in 2016.

Previously signed under Warner Music Philippines, the band is currently signed to Viva Records.

Band members

Current
 Brian Sombero - vocals, guitars, synths
 Timothy Abbott - synths, beats, programming
 Jason Rondero - bass 
 Jeffrey Castro - drums, samplers

Former
 Terence Teves
 MJ Dantes

Discography

Studio albums
Limerence (2016)

EPs
Perspectives (2014)

Singles
"Muted in Color"
"Unplanned"
"Balewala" 
"Siglon"
"Hagkan"

Awards and nominations

References

Filipino rock music groups
Musical groups from Metro Manila
Musical groups established in 2013
2013 establishments in the Philippines